Raif Dizdarević (born 9 December 1926) is a Bosnian politician who served as Yugoslavia's first Bosniak president of the Presidency from 1988 until 1989. He participated in the armed resistance as a Yugoslav Partisan during World War II. Didzarević also served as President of the Presidency of SR Bosnia and Herzegovina and as Minister of Foreign Affairs.

Early life
Dizdarević was born into a Bosniak Muslim family in 1926, but became and remained an atheist after entering school.

Political career

After the war, as a member of the Communist Party Dizdarević was elevated into high political functions. From 1945 he was a member of the State Security Administration. As a diplomat, he served in embassies in Bulgaria (1951–1954), the Soviet Union (1956–1959), and Czechoslovakia (1963–1967). 

Dizdarević was an assistant Federal Secretary of Foreign Affairs, with Miloš Minić being the Minister. From April 1978 until April 1982, he was the President of the Presidency of SR Bosnia and Herzegovina, after which he served as President of the Federal Assembly of Yugoslavia.

From 15 May 1984 until 30 December 1987, Dizdarević was the Minister of Foreign Affairs. On 15 May 1988, he became President of the Presidency of Yugoslavia, following the resignation of Hamdija Pozderac. During Dizdarević's time as head of state, Yugoslavia had a foreign debt of over US$21 billion and an annual inflation rate of 217 percent. In March 1989, Dizdarević had to cancel a foreign trip to Brazil, Uruguay and Senegal amid unrest in the Albanian-majority province of Kosovo.

Later life
Dizdarević, who tried to keep the Yugoslav federation together, lost his political influence with the start of the Yugoslav Wars. Later he lived in Sarajevo and published his memoirs. He published a memoir book Od smrti Tita do smrti Jugoslavije ("From the death of Tito to the death of Yugoslavia") and a book of memories on events and personalities ''Vrijeme koje se pamti' ("Times to be remembered").

His son Predrag lives in the United States, while his daughter Jasminka lives in Belgrade, Serbia. His nephew was journalist, diplomat, and activist Srđan Dizdarević, who died in 2016.

References

External links

Short biography
Hronika naslućene smrti, review of Dizdarević's book of memoirs 
Slobodnaevropa.org: Svjedoci raspada - Raif Dizdarević: Velika prevara (27. II 2008). 
Radiosarajevo.ba: Raif Dizdarević: Bio sam i ostao jugonostalgičar (26. X 2011).
Mojusk.ba: 'Put u raspad' - Knjiga Raifa Dizdarevića daje novo svjetlo o raspadu Jugoslavije (24. II 2012). 

1926 births
Living people
People from Fojnica
Bosniaks of Bosnia and Herzegovina
Bosnia and Herzegovina atheists
Bosnia and Herzegovina people of World War II
League of Communists of Bosnia and Herzegovina politicians
Central Committee of the League of Communists of Yugoslavia members
Chairmen of the Presidency of Bosnia and Herzegovina
Foreign ministers of Yugoslavia
Government ministers of Yugoslavia
Presidents of the Socialist Federal Republic of Yugoslavia